Louis Jules Duboscq (March 5, 1817 – September 24, 1886) was a French instrument maker, inventor, and pioneering photographer.  He was known in his time, and is remembered today, for the high quality of his optical instruments.

Life and work 

Duboscq was born at Villaines-sous-Bois (Seine-et-Oise) in 1817. He was apprenticed in 1834 to Jean-Baptiste-François Soleil (1798–1878), a prominent instrument maker, and he married one of Soleil's daughters, Rosalie Jeanne Josephine, in 1839.

Among the instruments Duboscq built were a stereoscope (marketing David Brewster's lenticular stereoscope), a colorimeter, a polarimeter, a heliostat and a saccharimeter.

See also 

 Colorimetry (chemical method)

References

Further reading

External links 
    
 Louis Jules Duboscq

19th-century French inventors
Pioneers of photography
19th-century French photographers
1817 births
1886 deaths
Photographers from Paris